Vincent Hoppezak (born 2 February 1999) is a Dutch road and track cyclist, who currently rides for UCI Continental team . He won the silver medal in the Scratch at the 2021 UEC European Track Championships.

Major results

Track
2016
 National Junior Championships
1st  Omnium
1st  Kilo
2nd Scratch race
3rd Individual pursuit
2019
 1st  Team pursuit, National Championships
2021
 2nd  Scratch race, UEC European Championships
 3rd  Points race, UCI World Championships
 3rd  Madison (with Philip Heijnen), UEC European Under-23 Championships
2022
 1st  Omnium, National Championships
 3rd  Points race, UEC European Championships
 3rd Six Days of Rotterdam (with Elia Viviani)

Road
2016
 4th Overall La Coupe du Président de la Ville de Grudziądz
1st Stage 1b

References

External links

1999 births
Living people
Dutch male cyclists
Dutch track cyclists
People from Capelle aan den IJssel
Dutch cyclists at the UCI Track Cycling World Championships
Cyclists from South Holland
20th-century Dutch people
21st-century Dutch people